Visconti is an Italian manufacturing company of luxury goods, founded in 1988 in Florence by Dante Del Vecchio and Luigi Poli, who were themselves collectors of fountain pens. The company became notable for the use of celluloid in the manufacturing of its pens, adding details in ivory, titanium, gold, diamond, ebonite, and acrylic fiber.

Visconti's handmade fountain pens have been recognised for their quality and fine craft, having released several collections since the company's inception.

History 
The company was founded on 20 October 1988 by Luigi Poli and Dante del Vecchio, two friends that decided to turn their passion for fountain pens into a business.

The first collection launched by Visconti was the "Classic", a pen made of celluloid, which would be used for several collections in successive years. The success of this pen encouraged its founders to release a new model, "Urushi", a limited edition of only 100 pieces, made of ebonite and decorated with the Japanese lacquerware technique.

During the 1990s, Visconti developed the high vacuum power filler system (1993), the travel inkwell (1997) and the double reservoir filling system (1998), which consisted of a double reservoir refilling system, to prevent leakage. By 2008, the company had 25 employees who made the pens handcrafted.

In 2009, Visconti reached a deal with Coles of London (actually based in North Carolina), whereby Coles became the official distributor of Visconti products in the United States. Together, both companies launched a range of new products, including the Rembrandt Collection, Opera Masters, Homo Sapiens Collection, Divina Royale range, and the limited-edition Templari.

By 2012, Visconti exported its crafted products to more than 50 countries around the world, with 50,000 pens sold by year.

Dante Del Vecchio left Visconti in 2016 due to a conflict with his business partner and later became chief pen designer at Pineider.

References

External links
 
 Visit with Visconti and President Dante del Vecchio

Manufacturing companies based in Florence
Fountain pen and ink manufacturers
Watch manufacturing companies of Italy
Jewellery companies of Italy
Italian brands
Luxury brands
Italian companies established in 1988